Antti Buri (born 2 December 1988) is a Finnish racing driver currently TCR Italian Series champion. Having previously competed in the ADAC TCR Germany Blancpain Endurance Series, Porsche Carrera Cup Germany & International GTSprint Series amongst others.

Racing career
Buri began his career in 2007 in Finnish Formula Ford Zetec, he raced there for many seasons up until 2009, also racing in the Formula Ford NEZ at the time. In 2009 he switched to the British Formula Ford Championship, he raced there up until 2012 and won the championship title that year. He switched to the Finnish Formula Ford Junior for 2010, taking the championship title in both 2010 & 2011. He made a couple of one-off appearances in the Benelux Formula Ford, ADAC Formel Masters & Portuguese GT Championship from 2011-13. For 2013 he switched to the Finnish Porsche GT3 Cup, ultimately winning the championship that year. In 2013 he made a one-off appearance in the Porsche Carrera Cup Germany series, ahead off a full entry in 2014, he finished 27th in the standings that year. From 2013-15 he made one-off appearances in the International GTSprint Series, Porsche Supercup & Blancpain Endurance Series. In 2016 he raced in the ADAC TCR Germany Touring Car Championship, he took his first win in race 2 at the second round held at Sachsenring.

In May 2016 it was announced that he would race in the TCR International Series, driving a Volkswagen Golf GTI TCR for Leopard Racing.

Racing record

Complete TCR International Series results
(key) (Races in bold indicate pole position) (Races in italics indicate fastest lap)

† Driver did not finish the race, but was classified as he completed over 75% of the race distance.

Complete 24 Hours of Nürburgring results

TCR Spa 500 results

References

External links
 
 
 

1988 births
Living people
TCR International Series drivers
Finnish racing drivers
Sportspeople from Turku
World Touring Car Cup drivers
24H Series drivers
W Racing Team drivers
Motopark Academy drivers
ADAC Formel Masters drivers
Nürburgring 24 Hours drivers
Engstler Motorsport drivers
TCR Europe Touring Car Series drivers
Porsche Carrera Cup Germany drivers
Hyundai Motorsport drivers